The Rutherford County Sheriff's Office is responsible for patrolling the towns and unincorporated areas of Rutherford County, North Carolina, operating the Detention Center, transporting inmates, securing the court house, executing warrants, serving civil papers, and ensuring public safety. Additionally, the Rutherford County Sheriff is the chief law enforcement officer of the county.  The current sheriff is republican Aaron Ellenburg. In 2016, the sheriff's salary was set at $82,555.

Organizational Structure 
Divisions and units of the Sheriff's Office.

 Administration
 Patrol
 Investigations
 Detective Unit
 Forensic Unit
 Narcotics Unit
 Support Services
 School Resource Officers
 Court House Security and Bailiffs
 Civil Process
 Warrant Process
 Detention Center
 Detention Crews
 Transportation
 Detention Investigator

Rank Structure 
The current rank structure used by the sheriff's office had been in effect since January 2023.

The leadership hierarchy as of January 2023:

 Sheriff Aaron Ellenburg
 Chief Deputy Randall Greenway
 Major Chad Nazelrod
 Captain Jamie Keever
 Captain Chris Lovelace, County Schools Investigator
 Captain Peter Wan, Detention Center
 Lieutenant Todd McDaniel
 Investigator C. McClung
 First Sergeant B. Sprouse
 Sergeant J. Splawn, Detention Crew
 Sergeant J. Brown, Detention Crew
 Sergeant B. Cole, Detention Crew
 Sergeant M. Logan, Detention Crew
 Captain Josh Padgett, Patrol
 Lieutenant T. Lowery, Patrol Crew A
 Sergeant J. Brandle, Patrol Crew A
 Lieutenant Allen Hardin, Patrol Crew B
 Sergeant B. King, Patrol Crew B
 Lieutenant Stephen Ellis, Patrol Crew C
 Sergeant C. Smith, Patrol Crew C
 Lieutenant Michael Snyder, Patrol Crew D
 Sergeant F. Lancaster, Patrol Crew D
 Captain Brian Gooch, Support Services
 Sergeant A. Greenway, School Resource Officers
 Sergeant E. Toney, Civil Process
 Sergeant J. Hoppes, Warrant Process
 Sergeant B. Hooper, Courthouse Security
 Lieutenant J. Upton, Investigations
 Sergeant J. Greenway, Forensics
 Sergeant J. Mode, Narcotics

Election of 2022 
 
The race for sheriff began crowded with five people running for office; incumbent Chris Francis (R), Anthony 'Tony' Roberson (R), James 'Aaron' Ellenburg (R), Steve 'Theo' Theodoropoulos (R), and Jason Wease (D). Before the primary election in May 2022, Tony Roberson registered to run unaffiliated, and Chris Francis had dropped out of the race after successfully being elected three times. Aaron Ellenburg won the Republican primary, beating out Theodoropoulos by 2,360 votes. In the Democratic primary, Jason Wease won by default without opposition. Three candidates remained and were on the general election ballot: Aaron Ellenburg (R), Jason Wease (D), and Tony Roberson (U).

After receiving unofficial final election night results from all county precincts, Aaron Ellenburg is the winner of the general election being more than 11,000 votes ahead of Jason Wease and more than 13,000 votes ahead of Tony Roberson. Ellenburg will be sworn in as the 47th Sheriff of Rutherford County on Monday, December 5, 2022 and will serve until the end of the term on Monday, December 7, 2026 per North Carolina General Statute § 163-1.

Former Sheriffs

References 

1779 establishments in North Carolina
Rutherford County, North Carolina
Sheriffs' offices of North Carolina